Martin Stephens may refer to:

Martin Stephens (actor) (born 1949), English child actor
Martin Stephens (judge) (born 1939), British judge
Martin Stephens (drug smuggler) (born 1976), Australian bartender and convicted drug trafficker

See also
Martin Stephan (1777–1846), pastor of St. John Lutheran Church in Dresden, Germany
Martin Stephen (born 1949), headmaster of St Paul's School in London 
Stephen Martin (disambiguation)
Martin Stevens (disambiguation)